Syaifudin (born July 20, 1978 in Jombang, East Java) is an Indonesian footballer. Currently he plays in Indonesia Super League for Persepam Madura United, as goalkeeper. Before the Persepam He played in Persiwa Wamena, Persela Lamongan, Arema Indonesia and Persebaya Surabaya.

References

Indonesian footballers
1978 births
Living people
People from Jombang Regency
Deltras F.C. players
Persebaya Surabaya players
Persibo Bojonegoro players
Arema F.C. players
Persiwa Wamena players
Persela Lamongan players
Persepam Madura Utama players
Indonesian Premier Division players
Liga 1 (Indonesia) players
Association football goalkeepers
Sportspeople from East Java